The Roman Catholic Diocese of Boac (Lat: Dioecesis Boacensis) is a diocese of the Latin Church of the Catholic Church in the Philippines.

Created suffragan of the Archdiocese of Lipa, separating from the Mother Diocese of Lucena on 2 April 1977, it has jurisdiction over the province of Marinduque.

History

In his book Historico Religioso Estado Geografico, 1865, Fr. Felix de Huerta says that the first apostle to Marinduque was the Franciscan Missionary Fray Estevan Cruz, who planted the first cross in 1579 that paved the way for the evangelization of the people. The first "visita" was established in 1580 and it was called "Monserrat de Marinduque" (now Boac) with Fray Alonzo Banol as its minister. In 1609 two other "visitas" were instituted, "San Juan de Marinduque" (now Sta. Cruz) and San Bernardo de Marinduque (now Gasan) with Fray Pedro de Talavera and Fray Juan Rosado as their first pastors, respectively. Later on, the Franciscans ceded the administration of the island to the Archbishop of Manila in 1613.

The Jesuits in the Philippines 1581-1768, a book written by Fr. Horacio de la Costa, states that Archbishop Miguel Garcia Serrano of Manila entrusted the island of Marinduque to the care of the Society of Jesus in 1621. The Jesuits stayed in the province and founded the town of Boac on 8 December 1622 and later on the towns of Sta. Cruz and Gasan. By virtue of a Spanish royal decree dated 19 May 1864, the Augusti-nian Recollect Fathers took over the spiritual administration of Boac in exchange for the curacies they left behind to the hands of the Jesuit missionaries in Mindanao.

Before the creation of the Diocese of Lipa by St. Pius X, the island of Marinduque, since 14 August 1595 till 10 April 1910, belonged to Archdiocese of Manila. When the Diocese of Lucena was created on 20 August 1950, Marinduque became a part of her. On 2 April 1977, by virtue of the apostolic bull "Cum Tempore Maturare" issued by Pope Paul VI, Marinduque was created as an independent diocese, called Diocese of Boac.

On 10 May 1978, carried by the effect of the Papal bull, the Diocese of Boac was canonically erected according to the Decretum Executorium signed by Most. Rev. Bruno Torpigliani, the Apostolic Nuncio to the Philippines. Most Rev. Rafael M. Lim, the former Bishop of Laoag since 1971 and a native of Boac, was appointed on 26 January 1978 by Paul VI as the first Bishop of the new diocese.

Boac is a poor diocese in the island province of Marinduque.  Its geographical location contributes to this situation driving Marinduquenos (the inhabitants of the island) to seek greener pasture outside of its provincial confine.  Some have defied poverty by going off of the island and engaging in business.  Many have succeeded; others have achieved the prestige of national positions in government offices; while the majority has remained in the island-province.

Through the guidance of the Rafael M. Lim, the first bishop of the diocese, a diocesan vision was made in 1981: Marinduque, Simbahan ng mga Dukha na may Katarungan, Pag-big at Kapayapaan. Through a concerted effort of the faith community and upon the leadership of the Clergy, the local Church of Marinduque tried to realize this dream for the diocese. Programs and activities were focused towards this vision.  In one of the monthly recollections in 1998, the members of the clergy affirmed that the diocese is a church that is materially poor but with a deep grasp and sense of the Lord.  The diocese aims towards a participatory church where both poor and rich people share each other's time, talent and treasure; where harmonious relationship exists between them thereby giving witness to the spirit of pastoral charity.  As the church denounces the sinful causes and structures of poverty, she at the same time designs programs and plans to alleviate the condition of the poor and inspires her ministers to the real witnessing of the spirit of poverty.

Although the diocese is materially poor, giving and sharing have a great place in the minds, hearts, and practices of the people.  Poverty has become an occasion for sensitivity among the people of God in the Local Church of Marinduque. On 10 September 1998, Most Rev. Rafael M. Lim, the first Bishop of the diocese died. Concerted efforts of the members of the Clergy and the collaboration of the faith community towards achieving a diocesan vision continued despite his death.

Prompted by the new Bishop Jose F. Oliveros, the First Diocesan Synod was held on 4–9 May 2003 whose objectives include: to thank God for all the graces the Diocese received from Him for the past years; to assess and evaluate the life of faith and pastoral activities in the past up to the present; and to plan for the better future of the Diocese. This ecclesial activity is based on the admonition of Pope John Paul II in his Apostolic Letter entitled Tertio Millennio Ineunte which says that: "We do all these things in order to discover and reflect on the face of Christ. Because our witnessing would be nothing if we would not discover and reflect the face of God."  Synodal decrees came out after a weeklong deliberation and reflection of the appointed delegates from the fourteen parishes of the diocese.  Participated also by government and civil servants and together with the different sectoral leaders from the local communities, the progress of the Synod edged slowly towards its historic culmination wherein decrees based on the diocesan vision: Marinduque Simbahan ng mga Dukha na may Katarungan, Pag-ibig at Kapayapaan were finally voted and ratified.  In her journey towards a new way of life as a church, after the advent of the Diocesan Synod 2003, the local church of Marinduque is once again sent by Christ: "Duc in altum, ecclesia pauperum, in iustitia, in caritate et in pace." 

After the Synodal Decrees were solemnly voted by the delegates at the Immaculate Conception Cathedral in Boac and canonically ratified by the Local Ordinary of the Diocese, much remained for their eventual implementation.  This has become the main task handed over to the new Bishop-elect Most Rev. Reynaldo G. Evangelista by the former Bishop Oliveros who was transferred to shepherd the Diocese of Malolos on 5 August 2004.  Having in mind the value of the Synodal Decrees, Bishop Evangelista expressed his desire to continue with the existing programs and activities in the diocese.  Equipped with pastoral experiences and engaged in the formation of seminarians in the Archdiocese of Lipa before becoming a Bishop of Boac, Bishop Evangelista called for a Pastoral Assembly in September 2006 to look into the Decrees and its implementation in the diocese. A Diocesan Pastoral Plan was unanimously approved based on the Synodal Decrees.

Ordinaries

See also

Catholic Church in the Philippines
Boac Cathedral

External links
Website of the Diocese of Boac
papal bull "Cum tempora maturuere" - papal bull of 2 April 1977 establishing the diocese of Boac, accessed from vatican.va (bull published in the Acta Apostolicae Sedis vol. 70 (1978), no. 1, pp. 5-6)
http://www.claretianpublications.com/index.php/catholic-directory/diocese/diocese-of-boac/67
Facebook page of the Diocese of Boac

 

Boac
Boac
Christian organizations established in 1977
Roman Catholic dioceses and prelatures established in the 20th century
1977 establishments in the Philippines
Religion in Marinduque